According to a 2009 Pew Research Center report, there are 1,000 Muslims in Gibraltar who constitute approximately 4% of the population.

History
Historically, Gibraltar was first foothold of Islam in Europe as Tariq Ibn Ziyad, a Moor military leader anchored herein 711. The place is named after him as Jabal-al-Tariq or Mountain of Tariq which is the origin of the name Gibraltar.

See also
 Ibrahim-al-Ibrahim Mosque
 Al-Andalus

References